Christianity is the majority religion in Cameroon, with significant minorities of the adherents of Islam and traditional faiths. 

Christian churches and Muslim centers of various denominations operate freely throughout Cameroon, while the traditionalists operate in their shrines and temples, which are also becoming popular today.

Main religions
The predominant faith is Christianity, practised by about two-thirds of the population, while Islam is a significant minority faith, adhered to by about one-fifth. Turkish NGO IHH estimates Muslims account for 25-30% of the Cameroonian population. The Christian population is divided between Roman Catholics (32.4 percent of the total population), Protestants (30.3 percent), and other Christian denominations (including Jehovah's Witnesses) 6 percent. The vast majority of the Muslims are Sunni belonging to Maliki school of jurisprudence, with approximately 2% Ahmadiyya and 3% Shia. Christians and Muslims are found in every region, although Christians are chiefly in the southern and western provinces and Muslims are the majority in the northern provinces.

Distribution
The two Anglophone provinces of the western region are largely Protestant, and the Francophone provinces of the southern and western regions are largely Catholic and Evangelicals. In the northern provinces, the locally dominant Fulani (or ) ethnic group is majority Muslim, but the overall population is fairly evenly mixed between Muslims, Christians, each often living in its own community. The Bamoun ethnic group of the West Province is largely Muslim. Traditional indigenous religious beliefs are practiced in rural areas throughout the country but rarely are practiced publicly in cities, in part because many indigenous religious groups are intrinsically local in character. There are also 200,000 Orthodox Christians(or 0.75%), with a constant and significant growth, especially in the north of the country

Other faiths
As of 2010, there were about 50,000 adherents of the Baháʼí Faith in the country. By 2001, the Baháʼí National Spiritual Assembly was registered with the Government of Cameroon as one of the few non-Christian foreign religions. There is a tiny population of Jews in Cameroon who have established ties with the wider global Jewish community. A community of approximately 50 people practice some form of Judaism in the country today. Hinduism is the faith practiced by some South Asian migrants. The Constitution provides for freedom of religion in Cameroon, and the government generally respects this right in practice. The country is generally characterized by a high degree of religious tolerance.

See also

Freedom of religion in Cameroon
Islam in Cameroon
Christianity in Cameroon
Roman Catholicism in Cameroon
Baháʼí Faith in Cameroon
Judaism in Cameroon
Zamba (god)

References